The Daly River is a river in the Northern Territory of Australia. Settlement on the river is centred on the Aboriginal community of Nauiyu, originally the site of a Catholic mission, as well as the town of Daly River itself, at the river crossing a few kilometres to the south. The Daly River is part of the Daly Catchment that flows from northern Northern Territory to central Northern Territory.

The Daly River flows  from the confluence of the Flora River and Katherine River to its mouth on the Timor Sea.

History
The traditional owners of the area are the Mulluk-Mulluk people.

Boyle Travers Finniss named the river after Sir Dominick Daly, the Governor of South Australia, as the Northern Territory was at that time part of South Australia. The region  then lay untouched by Europeans until 1882 when copper was discovered.

Floods
Like other rivers of the top end, the Daly is prone to seasonal flooding. Major flood events devastated the town of Daly River in 1899 and 1957, causing widespread property damage.

Attractions
The Daly River is famed for its large barramundi and is one of the more popular waterways for recreational fishing. It hosts two major fishing competitions annually, the "Barra Classic" and the "Barra Nationals".  The best barramundi fishing is generally just after the wet season when the flooded river is falling fast and clear water is pouring in off the floodplains. The floodwater carries baitfish which in turn attracts predatory barramundi.

The Daly River is home to more freshwater turtle species than anywhere else in Australia.

Tributaries
 Katherine River
 Fish River
 King River

See also
 List of rivers of Northern Territory
 Daly languages

References

Rivers of the Northern Territory
Victoria Daly Region